The Bridgeport Evening Farmer, also briefly known as the Daily Bridgeport Farmer and the Daily Republican Farmer, was a newspaper based out of Bridgeport, Connecticut from 1866 to 1917.

History

Predecessors 
The Bridgeport Evening Farmer's earliest predecessor, the Danbury-based Farmers Journal, began publication in March 1790. The newspaper underwent a series of name changes in the following years, becoming the Farmers Chronicle in 1793, and the Republican Journal in 1796. The paper would revert to its original name in 1800, but would briefly become the Farmer’s Journal and Columbian Ark for a few months in 1803.

In the early 1800s, Connecticut remained a strong Federalist stronghold, but under the leadership of editor Stiles Nicholas the newspaper was staunchly Democratic. Nicholas was fined and jailed in 1807 when defending the editor of another pro-Democrat paper from accusations of libel. Nicholas would move the paper, now called the Republican Farmer, from Danbury to Bridgeport in 1810. Over the following decades, and communication technology and printing rapidly improved, the paper published longer issues.

In 1837, Stiles Nicholas' son, Roswell Nicholas, took over as the Republican Farmer's editor, and took over the paper's management three years later.

Antebellum period 
Sometime in the mid-1850s, a man named William S. Pomeroy began a newspaper known as the Daily Farmer, partnering with a Yale-educated southerner named Nathan Stephen Morse. The Daily Farmer regularly published content highly critical of Abraham Lincoln, in defense of slavery, and, even during the Civil War, supportive of peace with the Confederacy. On August 24, 1861, a pro-union mob led by soldiers attacked the Farmer’s offices, and Pomeroy and Morse both fled the scene. After the Civil War, journalist James B. Gould and printer Henry B. Stiles took over the publication of the long-lived weekly Republican Farmer and the Daily Farmer, the latter of which was now called the Evening Farmer, and in 1866, was renamed to the Bridgeport Evening Farmer.

As the Bridgeport Evening Farmer 

Stiles Nicholas' son-in-law Floyd Tucker took over the position as editor of the Bridgeport Evening Farmer, and continued the paper's militant Democratic alignment. Under Tucker's management, the paper engaged in acrimonious disputes with other papers, and actively supported Democratic candidates in the area. Bridgeport mayor Denis Mulvihill credited the paper with securing his re-election in 1903. The Bridgeport Evening Farmer also frequently supported the causes of organized labor, regularly calling for better wages and shorter working hours. In 1915, when workers went on strike in Bridgeport for an eight-hour work day, the paper publicly supported them. However, upon the United States' entry into World War I, the paper called upon the city's unions to limit strike actions.

Under later names 
From 1917 to 1927, the newspaper underwent a series of name changes, finally settling on the Bridgeport Times-Star following a merger in 1926.

Following the 1926 merger, James L. McGovern became the editor of the paper. His editorial style was noted as a stark departure of Tucker's partisan management, and proclaimed that the Bridgeport Times-Star would be an "independent newspaper" which conformed to the "modern standards of journalism". This new style attracted a degree of success, and the Bridgeport Times-Star boasted circulation of 22,000 and a readership of 100,000 by November 1930, beating out the city's other large paper, the Bridgeport Post (now the Connecticut Post).

During the Great Depression, the newspaper experience financial hardship, and was unable to pay dividends to its shareholders. In 1941, the Bridgeport Post bought out the Bridgeport Times-Star for $200,000, and destroyed their equipment, ending daily newspaper competition in the city. The Bridgeport Times-Star published its last issue on November 25, 1941.

Digitalization 
Issues of the Bridgeport Evening Farmer have been digitalized by the Library of Congress and the Connecticut State Library.

References 

Defunct newspapers published in Connecticut
Mass media in Bridgeport, Connecticut